The Galgenberg Formation is a geologic formation in Germany. It preserves fossils dating back to the Cambrian period.

See also

 List of fossiliferous stratigraphic units in Germany

References
 

Cambrian System of Europe
Cambrian Germany
Cambrian southern paleotemperate deposits